Saad el-Din el-Alami (1911–6 February 1993) was a Sunni Muslim religious leader of the Palestinian people and the fourth Grand Mufti of Jerusalem, in office from 1952 until his death.

Al-Alami was born in Jerusalem in 1911, and worked as a sharia judge in Ramallah from 1948–51 and in Nablus from 1951–53. In 1952, the Jordanian Jerusalem Islamic Waqf appointed Saad al-Alami as Mufti of Jerusalem in succession to Hussam ad-Din Jarallah.

References

External links
Palestinian Personalities: Al-Alami, Sa‘ad Eddin

1911 births
1993 deaths
Al-Azhar University alumni
Grand Muftis of Jerusalem
Palestinian Sunni Muslims
Mandatory Palestine expatriates in Egypt